Merzagua Abderrazak (born 1967 in Morocco) is a Moroccan former professional footballer and head coach.

On 4 August 2001, he played in 2001 Sultan of Selangor Cup as a guest player.

Playing career

Penang

Brought in as a foreign player to Malaysian side Penang in the early 1990s, Abderrazak spearheaded the club to two top division championships in 1998 and 2001 plus second-place finishes in 1999 and 2000 with his deftness and goalscoring ability. Called the 'Great Merz' by besotted fans, he has been described as one of the greatest foreign footballers to have ever played in Malaysia and Southeast Asia.

Gombak United

Moving to Gombak United of Singapore in 2001, Abderrazak reunited with his former Penang coach Moey Yok Ham and Guinean Ballamodou Conde wearing the number 9.  However, the forward was unable to concentrate on football due to his family business in Morocco failing. In the end, he left the club to support his family's business, apologizing to mentor Moey Yok Ham along the way.

Coaching career

Penang

Announced as Penang head coach in late 2012, Abderrazak's aim was to lift the club out of the third-tier Malaysia FAM League. Of the first three friendlies the team played through the preseason, they recorded two losses but won once against Perak of the Malaysia Super League thanks to the home fans. Leading the club to the 2013 FAM League championship and promotion to the 2014 Malaysia Premier League, Abderrazak was disallowed from being their coach for the upcoming season in the second tier as he did not have the coaching badges that the league entailed. Three years later, the Moroccan earned his licenses and a number of sources close to Penang stated that he could return to helm the state team which never happened.

Abderrazak was disappointed with Penang's performance in the 2017 Malaysia Super League owing to the fact that his former club were at the bottom of the league table. Ever since his departure, he has been appraising the Panthers performances in competitions.

Sungai Ara FC

Picked to take the reins of Penang-based outfit Sungai Ara on a one-year contract in late 2014, the former striker was greeted by supporters, players and officials upon arrival to the Malaysian state. Improving the fitness level and morale of the players ahead of the season with six months of preparation and 30 friendlies played, his target was to gain promotion to the Malaysia Premier League by 2016, expressing gratefulness to the board.

Honours

As player 
Penang
 Malaysia Premier 1 League (2): 1998, 2001

As coach 
Penang
 Malaysia FAM League: 2013

References

External links
 'I respect him like my own father' - The New Paper (only accessible from multimedia stations at NLB libraries)
 Meet the Moroccan Magician Merzagua - Singapore Today (only accessible from multimedia stations at NLB libraries)

Moroccan footballers
Association football forwards
Moroccan football managers
Living people
1967 births
Penang F.C. players
Expatriate footballers in Malaysia
Expatriate footballers in Singapore
Moroccan expatriate footballers
Moroccan expatriate sportspeople in Malaysia
Singapore Premier League players